The works of the Czech composer Alois Hába consists of 103 opuses, with the majority of the compositions being various kinds of chamber music pieces, predominantly for piano or strings. The most important works include his String quartets, which document and demonstrate the development of the composer's style (microtonal music and his most innovative opera: "Matka" (Mother). Hába's first microtonal composition is Suite, op.1a from 1918, his earliest published mictrotonal piece is the 2nd Quartet (1920) and his last was the 16th Quartet from 1967.

Note that 'semitone' refers to the usual 12-tET scale, 'quarter-tone' refers to 24-tET, '5th-tone' refers to 31-tET (not 30-tET), '6th-tone' refers to 36-tET, '12-tone' refers to Schoenberg's '12-tone method'.

List of works 

 Op.no. 1 : Sonata for violin and piano (1914–15)
 Op.no. 1a: Suite (3 fugues) for piano (1918)
 Op.no. 1b: Variations for piano on a canon of Robert Schumann (1914–15, * 1918)
 Op.no. 2 : 2 Sketches for piano
 Op.no. 3 : Sonata for piano
 Op.no. 4 : String Quartet No.1 (semitone), 1919
 Op.no. 5 : Overture for orchestra
 Op.no. 6 : 6 piano pieces (1920)
 Op.no. 7 : String Quartet No.2 (quarter-tone), 1920
 Op.no. 8 : Symphonic Fantasy for piano & orchestra (1920-1921)
 Op.no. 9a: Fantasy in quarter-tones for violin solo (1921)
 Op.no. 9b: Music in quarter-tones for violin solo (1922)
 Op.no. 10: 1st Suite for quarter-tone piano (revised 1932 as op. 11a), 1922
 Op.no. 11: 2nd Suite for quarter-tone piano (revised 1932 as op. 11b), 1922
 Op.no. 12: 3rd String Quartet (quarter-tone), 1922
 Op.no. 13: Vocal-suite in quarter-tones (choir), 1922
 Op.no. 14: 4th String Quartet (quarter-tone), 1922
 Op.no. 15: 5th String Quartet (Hába's 1st 6th-tone composition), 1923
 Op.no. 16: 3rd Suite for quarter-tone piano (1923)
 Op.no. 17: 1st Fantasy for quarter-tone piano (1923)
 Op.no. 18: Fantasy in quarter-tones for cello solo (1924)
 Op.no. 19: 2nd Fantasy for quarter-tone piano (1924)
 Op.no. 20: 3rd Fantasy for quarter-tone piano (1924)
 Op.no. 21: Fantasy for violin & quarter-tone piano (1925)
 Op.no. 22: 4th Suite for quarter-tone piano (1925)
 Op.no. 23: 5th Suite for quarter-tone piano (1925)
 Op.no. 24: 1st Suite for quarter-tone clarinet & quarter-tone piano (1925)
 Op.no. 25: 4th Fantasy for quarter-tone piano (1925)
 Op.no. 26: 5th Fantasy for quarter-tone piano (1925)
 Op.no. 27: 6th Fantasy for quarter-tone piano (1926)
 Op.no. 28: 7th Fantasy for quarter-tone piano (1926)
 Op.no. 29: 8th Fantasy for quarter-tone piano (1926)
 Op.no. 30: 9th Fantasy for quarter-tone piano (1926)
 Op.no. 31: 10th Fantasy for quarter-tone piano (1926)
 Op.no. 32: Fantasy for viola & quarter-tone piano (1926)
 Op.no. 33: Fantasy for cello & quarter-tone piano (1927)
 Op.no.34a: Fantasy for flute (or violin) & piano (1927–28)
 Op.no.34b: Suite (arr. J. Horák) (bass-clarinet & piano) 1927-28
 Op.no. 35: Matka (Mother), quarter-tone opera in 10 scenes (1927–28)
 Op.no. 36: Já (Me) - quarter-tone men's choir (1928)
 Op.no. 37: 6 Pieces for 6th-tone harmonium or string quartet (1928)
 Op.no. 38: Toccata quasi una Fantasia (semitone piano), 1931
 Op.no. 39: 4 Modern Dances for piano (1927-1931)
 Op.no. 40: Fantasy for Nonet Nr. 1 (12-tone), 1931
 Op.no. 41: Fantasy for Nonet Nr. 2 (7-tone), 1932
 Op.no. 42: 5 Choruses (3 quarter-tone boy's or women's voices), 1932
 Op.no. 43: Children's Play (quarter-tone children's voices: soli and choir), 1932
 Op.no. 44: 5 Mixed Choruses (quarter-tone choir)
 Op.no. 45: Pracující den (The working day), 10 quarter-tone men's choruses (1932)
 Op.no. 46: Cesta života (The Path of Life), symphonic fantasy for orchestra  & Mass Songs for choir (1933)
 Op.no. 47: Nová země (The New Earth), 12-tone opera in 3 acts & 6 scenes (1934–36)
 Op.no. 48: Children's rhymes (medium voice & piano), 1936
 Op.no. 49: Duo for 6th-tone violins (1937)
 Op.no. 50: Přijď království Tvé (Thy Kingdom Come), 6th-tone musical drama in 7 scenes, 1937–42
 Op.no. 51: Dětské nálady (Children's Moods), 8-song cycle (middle voice & quarter-tone guitar), 1943
 Op.no. 52: Sonata for guitar (1943)
 Op.no. 53: Poesie života (Poetry of Life), 12-song cycle (soprano & quarter-tone guitar), 1943
 Op.no. 54: 1st Suite for quarter-tone guitar (1943)
 Op.no. 55: 2nd Suite for quarter-tone clarinet (solo), 1943
 Op.no. 56: Suite for quarter-tone trumpet & trombone (1944)
 Op.no. 57: Milenci (The Lovers), 7-song cycle (soprano & piano), 1944
 Op.no. 58: 5 Moravian Love-songs (mezzo-soprano, guitar or piano accompaniment), 1944
 Op.no. 59: Sonata for Chromatic Harp (1944)
 Op.no. 60: Sonata for Diatonic Harp (1944)
 Op.no. 61: Intermezzo and Praeludium for diatonic harp (1944–45)
 Op.no. 62: Sonata for quarter-tone piano (1946–47)
 Op.no. 63: 2nd Suite for quarter-tone guitar (1947)
 Op.no. 64: Ústava 9. května (Constitution of May 9) for men's choir (1948)
 Op.no. 65: 3 Men's Choruses (1948)
 Op.no. 66: Meditace (Meditation) for men's choir (1948)
 Op.no. 67: Mír (Peace) for men's choir (1948)
 Op.no.67a: Soviet Songs (choir), 1948 & Mass Songs (choir), 1948-50
 Op.no. 68: Za mír (For Peace), cantata (choir & orchestra), 1949
 Op.no. 69: Suite for bassoon solo (1950)
 Op.no. 70: 6th String Quartet (quarter-tone), 1950
 Op.no. 71: 3 Men's Choruses (1950)
 Op.no. 72: Suite in quarter-tones for 4 trombones (1950)
 Op.no. 73: 7th String Quartet "Christmas" (semitone), 1950–51
 Op.no. 74: Quartet for 4 bassoons (1951)
 Op.no.75a: Fantasy for organ (1951)
 Op.no.75b: Fantasy and Fugue "HABA" for organ (1951)
 Op.no.75c: 6 Polish Folksongs for harp (1951)
 Op.no. 76: 8th String Quartet (semitone), 1951
 Op.no. 77: Valašská suita (Wallachian Suite) for orchestra, 1951–53
 Op.no. 78: Sonata for clarinet (solo), 1951
 Op.no. 79: 9th String Quartet (semitone), 1951
 Op.no. 80: 10th String Quartet (6th-tone), 1951
 Op.no.81a: Suite for violin solo (1955)
 Op.no.81b: Suite for cello solo (1955)
 Op.no. 82: 3rd Nonet (1953–55)
 Op.no. 83: Violin Concerto (1954–55)
 Op.no. 84: Slovanské mudrosloví (Slavic Proverbs) for boy's or women's choir & piano (1945–55)
 Op.no.85a: Suite in 6th-tones for violin solo (1955)
 Op.no.85b: Suite in 6th-tones for cello solo (1955)
 Op.no. 86: Viola Concerto (1955–57)
 Op.no. 87: 11th String Quartet (6th-tone), 1957–58
 Op.no. 88: Suite Nr. 6 (quarter-tone piano), 1957–59
 Op.no. 89: Fantasy Nr. 11 (quarter-tone piano), 1959
 Op.no. 90: 12th String Quartet (quarter-tone), 1959–60
 Op.no. 91: Suite for dulcimer (1960)
 Op.no. 92: 13th String Quartet (semitone), 1961
 Op.no. 93: Suite in quarter-tones for violin (1961–62)
 Op.no. 94: 14th String Quartet (quarter-tone), 1963
 Op.no. 95: 15th String Quartet (semitone), 1964
 Op.no. 96: Suite for bass-clarinet (1965)
 Op.no. 97: 4th Nonet (1967-1971)
 Op.no. 98: 16th String Quartet (5th-tone), 1967
 Op.no. 99: Suite for saxophone solo (1968)
 Op.no.99a: Praha [Prague] for choir, 1968
 Op.no.100: Suite for bass-clarinet with piano (1969)
 Op.no.101: Poznámky z deníku (Diary-notes), melodrama for speaker & string-quartet (1970)
 Op.no.102: 6 Moods for piano (1971)
 Op.no.103: Suite for violin & piano (1972)

Representative recordings 

 Complete String Quartets (Streichquartette - Gesamtaufnahme; 4 CD, Bayer Records, Germany, 2006), performed by Czech ensemble Stamic Quartet
 Four Fugues for Organ as the part of the album Alois Hába / Miloslav Kabeláč / Jan Hora / Petr Čech – Complete Organ Works (Vixen, Czech Republic, 2001, CD)
 Complete Nonets by Czech Nonet, (Supraphon, Czech Republic, 1995)
 Czech Music Of The 20th Century: Alois Hába - Chamber Music by Suk Quartet and Czech Nonet (Praga, France, 1993)
 Mother by Prague National Theatre Orchestra, chorus and soloists (Supraphon, Czechoslovakia, 1966, 1980 & 1982 - 2LP; CD)

See also 
 20th-century classical music

References 

Haba, Alois